Acacia homalophylla is a small tree found in the eastern half of Australia, where it is known as the yarran. It has also been introduced into India and Pakistan.

Description 
Acacia homalophylla has a clean trunk and leafy head, a dark gray, rough bark, narrow, usually straight leaves, and yellow flowers in balls. The leaves are edible and used for fodder. It usually flowers in August–October, sometimes November.

It yields a gum. Its wood (called myall-wood) is durable, fragrant, and dark-colored, and used by the natives for spears.

It has glabrous branchlets that can be slightly hairy on new growth and are angled at extremities. Like most species of Acacia it has phyllodes rather than true leaves.

Etymology 
The name probably refers to the smoothness of the phyllodes, which are flat and often appear veinless. Bentham, when publishing this species, used the spelling omalophylla, which he corrected to 'homalophylla' in his Flora of Australiense in 1864. The former spelling is used by some botanists and authors.

Distribution
It has a scattered distribution through Queensland, New South Wales and Victoria. In New South Wales it is found to the west of Muswellbrook and Emmaville and is often a part of Casuarina cristata, rosewood and box communities growing in brown earthy soils.

See also
List of Acacia species

References 

homalophylla
Trees of Australia
Flora of Queensland
Flora of New South Wales
Flora of Victoria (Australia)
Taxa named by George Bentham
Plants described in 1842